There is an incomplete list of governors of Azerbaijan, a region in northwestern Iran.

Kings of Media Atropatene

 Atropates from 320s BC til an unknown date
 Artabazanes (flourished 3rd century BC) ruled in 221 BC or 220 BC, a contemporary of the Seleucid Greek King Antiochus III the Great. He is said to be a paternal grandson of the Persian King Darius II from his marriage to the daughter of Gobryas
 Mithridates (100 BC – 66 BC), ruled from 67 BC to c. 66 BC who was father-in-law of the Armenian King Tigranes the Great
 Darius I (c. 85 BC – c. 65 BC), ruled c. 65 BC
 Ariobarzanes I (c. 85 BC – 56 BC), ruled from 65 BC to 56 BC
 Artavasdes I (65 BC – 20 BC), ruled from 56 BC until 31 BC. Son of the above named Ariobarzanes and a son-in-law of King Antiochus I Theos of Commagene
 Asinnalus (flourished 1st century BC), ruled from 30 BC to an unknown date in the 20s BC
 Ariobarzanes II (40 BC – 4), ruled sometime from 28 BC to 20 BC until 4 AD and served as King of Armenia from 2 BC to 4
 Artavasdes II, who served as Artavasdes III (20 BC – 6), King of Media Atropatene and Armenia from 4 AD to 6 AD
 Artabanus (flourished second half of 1st century BC – 38 AD), grandson of Artavasdes I, ruled from 6 until 10
 Vonones (flourished second half of 1st century BC – 51 AD), brother of Artabanus and ruled from 11? until 51
 Pacorus (flourished 1st century & first half of 2nd century), son of the above named and ruled from 51 AD until 78 AD

Early Arabic rulers 
Al-Ash'ath ibn Qays, governor of Adharbayjan 
Maslama ibn Abd al-Malik, governor of Adharbayjan (731-733)
Sa'id ibn Amr al-Harashi, governor of Adharbayjan (733-735)
Yahya ibn Khalid, governor of Adharbayjan (765-?)
Khaydhar ibn Kawus al-Afshin, governor of Adharbayjan (835-?) 
Mankjur al-Farghani (837-?)

Sajid dynasty 
Muhammad ibn Abi'l-Saj, Afshin of Azerbaijan (889–901)
Devdad ibn Muhammad, Emir of Azerbaijan (901)
Yusuf ibn Abi'l-Saj, Emir of Azerbaijan (901–928)
Subuk, Emir of Azerbaijan (919–922)
Abu'l-Musafir al-Fath, Emir of Azerbaijan (928–929)

Arabic governors 
Wasif al-Shirvani
Muflih al-Saji (c. 929–935)
Daysam ibn Ibrahim al-Kurdi (ca. 937/8–942)
Abu Mansur Muhammad

Sallarid dynasty 

Muhammad ibn Musafir, ruler of Azerbaijan (919–941)
Marzuban ibn Muhammad, ruler of Azerbaijan (941/2–949)
Muhammad ibn Musafir, ruler of Azerbaijan (949–953)
Marzuban ibn Muhammad, ruler of Azerbaijan (949–957)
Justan I ibn Marzuban I, ruler of Azerbaijan (957–960)
Ismail ibn Wahsudan, ruler of Azerbaijan (960–?)
Ibrahim I ibn Marzuban I, ruler of Azerbaijan (957–979)
Nuh ibn Wahsudan, ruler of Azerbaijan 
Marzuban II ibn Ismail, ruler of Azerbaijan

Golden Horde governor of Azerbaijan (claimant) 
 Chormaqan 1230 - 1241
 Baiju Noyan 1241 - 1260
 Shiramun 1260 -

Timurid governors of Azerbaijan 
Miran Shah

Safavid governors of Azerbaijan 

Haqqverdi Sultan ?-1593
Farhad Khan Qaramanlu (1593)
Zu'l Fiqar Qaramanlu
Shahbandeh Beg Torkman (1st term)
Qarachaqay Khan (1618-1620)  
Shahbandeh Beg Torkman (2nd term)
Rustam Khan (1632–1633)
Bijan Beg
Aliqoli Khan
Vakhtang VI of Kartli
Prince Bakar of Kartli
Safiqoli Khan Ziyadoghlu Qajar (aka Aliqoli Khan)
Mohammad-Ali Khan of Tabriz (1719-1720)
Mikhri (Mehdi?) Khan

Qajar governors of Azerbaijan 

Abbas Mirza (1798-?)
Djahangir Mirza 
Fereydoon Mirza (1831-?)
Nosrat-od-Dowleh Firouz Mirza (1837-1850)
Bahman Mirza Qajar (1841-?)
Mehdi Qoli Hedayat (1908-1911)

Pahlawi governors of Azerbaijan 
Mozaffar Alam (1950-?)
Mohsen Rais (1958-1960)

Notes

References
 
 
 
 
 
 
  
 
 
 

 Играр Алиев. Очерк Истории Атропатены (Азернешр, 1989) 
 
 
 
 

History of Azerbaijan (Iran)